Vice Admiral Evelyn Claude Ogilvie Thomson  (13 April 1884 – 21 December 1941) was a Royal Navy officer who became Commander-in-Chief, Coast of Scotland.

Naval career
Thomson joined the Royal Navy as a cadet in 1899. He served in World War I and commanded the destroyer  at the Battle of Jutland. He was appointed Commander of the 3rd Destroyer Flotilla in 1926, Captain-in-charge in Singapore in 1929 and Commander of the boys' training establishment  in Gosport in 1932. He went on to be Commander of the Home Fleet Destroyer Flotillas in 1935 and Commander-in-Chief, Coast of Scotland in 1937. He retired in 1939.

Family
In 1918 he married Agnes Motherwell Wilson.

References

1884 births
1941 deaths
Royal Navy vice admirals
Companions of the Order of the Bath
Companions of the Distinguished Service Order
People educated at Stubbington House School
Royal Navy officers of World War I